CHWV-FM is a Canadian radio station in Saint John, New Brunswick broadcasting at 97.3 FM. The station broadcasts a hot adult contemporary format branded as 97.3 The Wave.

The station is owned by Acadia Broadcasting which also owns sister station CHSJ-FM.

History
On August 24, 2000, New Brunswick Broadcasting Co., Limited received approval by the CRTC to operate a new adult contemporary music format at Saint John.

Their first broadcast was on February 19, 2001, as an Adult Contemporary station. In January 2003, the station changed formats to adult top 40, morphing to more of a modern adult contemporary direction (or an adult top 40/alternative rock mix).

The station's new main competitor is CIOK-FM, which changed to hot AC in 2009. The station's other competitor is CIBX-FM in Fredericton.

Since 2011, the station began phasing in more rhythmic contemporary content; however it is still a Canadian hot adult contemporary reporter per Mediabase and Nielsen BDS. Even though non-pop rock music still gets a few adds, they remain a modern adult contemporary.

References

External links
97.3 The Wave
 

Hwv
Hwv
Hwv
Radio stations established in 2001
2001 establishments in New Brunswick